Eleonora Pedron (born 13 July 1982) is an Italian model and actress, who was crowned Miss Italia 2002. She later briefly served as a weather presenter on Italy's Rete 4 channel. As an actress she was most recently seen in the TV series Donna Detective.

Personal life
Pedron has two children by then-boyfriend and 2012 World Superbike Championship winner Max Biaggi.

References

External links

1982 births
Living people
Italian beauty pageant winners
Italian female models
Italian actresses
Italian television presenters
Actors from Padua
Italian women television presenters